George II served as Greek Patriarch of Alexandria between 1021 and 1052.

References

11th-century Patriarchs of Alexandria
Melkites in the Fatimid Caliphate